Tayforth Camanachd is a shinty team originally from Perth, Scotland, but now playing at Levenhall Links, Musselburgh. In 2016, the club finished at the top of South Division 2.

History
Tayforth Camanachd is a shinty team originally from Perth, Scotland, but now playing at Peffermill Playing Fields, Edinburgh. Whilst historically based in Perth, the team has always drawn players from all over the Tayside and Lothian area. The club currently plays in South Division 1. The club's nickname throughout its history has been "The Sweeney".

Formed in Perth in 1973 by Barry Nesbitt, Tim Neville, John-Joe Moran and Father Eugene O'Sullivan (aka the shinty priest) the club drew upon Highlanders living in the Central Belt as well as the Irish community in Perth.

Over the years the team has had a second team, run successfully by Roy Whitehead (Rector, Perth High School) who would invariably extol the virtues of shinty as a "manly sport" to his pupils. However, with his retirement the second team consisted mainly of veterans, newcomers and veteran newcomers.

A great figure in the history of the club was the late Willie Dowds, whose son Cahal would play and more often than not end up in A&E for Tayforth. Willie also helped form teams in Dundee and Glenrothes. A visionary, he once nearly caused a riot at the Camanachd Associations AGM by suggesting not only Sunday shinty but summer shinty. Some 30 years later the Camanachd Association would introduce summer shinty. Another character in those early years was Fr. Eugene O'Sullivan who famously appeared on the front page of the Daily Star in 1982, having been sent-off for punching his opponent. The Kyles player was lucky that John-Joe Moran was restrained by Sam "the vet" Mansley from doing further damage. However, the return fixture in Perth entered shinty folklore when once again Fr. O'Sullivan was on the receiving end of some extremely unsavoury treatment but didn't rise to the provocation this time. At half time following a discussion between Willie Dowds, John-Joe Moran & Sam Mansley they decided to invoke Willie John McBrides "99" call. Thus, the next time Fr O'Sullivan was hit the "99" call went out. Within seconds mayhem descended on the South Inch and not one Kyles player was left standing. There were no sending-offs and Tayforth ran-out 4-1 winners.

The team of the late 1970s and early 1980s was littered with characters, none more so than Hugh O'Kane who along with Fr. Eugene would lead the team over to Kilkenny, Ireland to participate in "The Faire Cities Cup". Stories of missed ferries, flights and lost players would make that era legendary. One player from that era, Bill Adams was lost after visiting the Guinness distillery @ St James Gate, Dublin in 1989. The legend that is Hugh O'Kane was responsible for landing a sea-king helicopter on the South Inch, Perth, 10 minutes from the end of a Frews Cup match. Hugh was stationed in Helmand province, Afghanistan, with UN. In early January 2016 Hugh passed away.

Following the retirement of stalwarts Hugh Macmaster, Terry "Butcher" Wade, truly one of Tayforths dirtiest & meanest players and John-Joe Moran a period of decline began. Only for a new breed of players to emerge, such as Donald Kinnear, whose dominant displays in midfield would herald the start of a new era. The club reached the Camanachd Cup semi-final in 1988 and won the national Aviemore sixes in 1990.

The club ran the annual shinty competition at the Blairgowrie Highland Games. The club has links with Linlithgow Shinty Club at Junior level.

The club narrowly missed out on promotion to South Division One in 2011 after a winner-takes-all game with Strachur. Due to the poor state of the pitch at the North Inch during season 2011, many games were played at Edinburgh East Lothian's old park, Levenhall Links. Tayforth made a move to Levenhall on a more continuous basis for season 2012.[1]▼

The club's 40th Anniversary was marked in 2013 with dinner at The Caves, in Edinburgh’s Cowgate, with guest speaker Hugh Dan MacLennan and music from The Occasionals. Prior to the dinner Tayforth players past and present turned out for a match in celebration of the Club’s 40th Anniversary. It featured Badenoch stars Stuart Ferrier and Rory Fraser, as well as Father and Son combo Derry and Calum Barton. Staying true to the Irish roots of Tayforth, Brendan Duggan, the latest in a long line of Hurlers turned Shinty players, also took the field.

References

Shinty teams
Sport in East Lothian
Sport in Perth, Scotland
Sport in Dundee
1873 establishments in Scotland
Sports clubs established in 1873